In biology, trimorphism is the existence in certain plants and animals of three distinct forms, especially in connection with the reproductive organs.

In trimorphic plants there are three forms, differing in the lengths of their pistils and stamens, in size and color of their pollen grains, and in some other respects; and, as in each of the three forms there are two sets of stamens, the three forms possess altogether six sets of stamens and three kinds of pistils.  These organs are so proportioned in length to each other that half the stamens in two of the forms stand on a level with the stigma of the third form.  To obtain full fertility with these plants, it is necessary that the stigma of the one should be fertilized by pollen taken from the stamens of corresponding height in another form.  Hence six unions are legitimate, that is, fully fertile, and 12 are illegitimate, or more or less unfertile.  Wallace has shown that the females of certain butterflies from the Malay Archipelago appear in three conspicuously distinct forms without intermediate links.

In crystallography, trimorphism refers to the occurrence of certain forms in minerals which have the same chemical composition, but are referable to three systems of crystallization.

See also
 Sexual dimorphism

Notes
 Text from Collier's New Encyclopedia (1921).

Plant physiology
Pollination
Sex